George Sidney (born Sammy Greenfield; 18 March 1876 – 29 April 1945) was a Hungarian-born American comedian and film actor. He starred in The Cohens and Kellys film series.

Early years 
Born in Nagynichal, Hungary, Sidney was the son of Lewis K. Sidney, an executive at Metro-Goldwyn-Mayer. He was the uncle of the film director George Sidney.

Career
In his youth, Sidney performed on amateur night programs at Miner's Bowery Theatre in New York City. His professional debut came at the Harlem Museum], and he went on to perform in burlesque. In his film debut he portrayed Potash in In Hollywood with Potash and Perlmutter.

Death
On April 29, 1945, Sidney died at his home in Los Angeles, aged 69. He was buried in Beth Olam Cemetery of Hollywood.

Selected filmography

 In Hollywood with Potash and Perlmutter (1924)
 Classified (1925)
 The Cohens and Kellys (1926)
 The Prince of Pilsen (1926)
 Millionaires (1926)
 Sweet Daddies (1926)
 Partners Again (1926)
 The Auctioneer (1927)
 Clancy's Kosher Wedding (1927)
 For the Love of Mike (1927)
 Lost at the Front (1927)
 The Life of Riley (1927)
 The Latest from Paris (1928)
 Flying Romeos (1928)
 We Americans (1928)
 Give and Take (1928)
 The Cohens and the Kellys in Paris (1928)
 The Cohens and Kellys in Atlantic City (1929)
 The Cohens and the Kellys in Scotland (1930)
 The Cohens and the Kellys in Africa (1930)
 Around the Corner (1930)
 Caught Cheating (1931)
 The Heart of New York (1932)
 High Pressure (1932)
 The Cohens and Kellys in Hollywood (1932)
 The Cohens and Kellys in Trouble (1933)
 Rafter Romance (1933)
 Manhattan Melodrama (1934)
 Diamond Jim (1935)
 The Good Old Soak (1937)

References

Bibliography
 Kear, Lynn & King, James. Evelyn Brent: The Life and Films of Hollywood's Lady Crook. McFarland & Co, 2009.
 Munden, Kenneth White. The American Film Institute Catalog of Motion Pictures Produced in the United States, Part 1. University of California Press, 1997.

External links

1876 births
1945 deaths
American male film actors
American male stage actors
Hungarian male film actors
Hungarian male stage actors
Austro-Hungarian emigrants to the United States
American Jews
Hungarian Jews